The Super Bowl XXVII halftime show took place on January 31, 1993, at the Rose Bowl, Pasadena, California, as part of Super Bowl XXVII.

In an effort to increase its profile after being counterprogrammed by an In Living Color special the previous year, the show featured a performance by Michael Jackson. The performance was successful in its goals, causing viewership of the Super Bowl to increase between halves for the first time in the game's history. The show, along with other notable appearances by Jackson in late-January and February, also helped improve sales of his current album Dangerous. 

Retrospectively, the show has been credited with establishing the norms of future Super Bowl halftime shows (with a greater focus on major names in popular music), and ranked as being among the greatest Super Bowl halftime shows of all time.

Background
Prior to Super Bowl XXVII, the game's halftime show often featured performances by marching bands, and later drill teams and ensembles such as Up with People—acts that, by the 1990s, were considered to be culturally outdated. The previous year's halftime show had featured a salute to the 1992 Winter Olympics, with figure skating performances by Brian Boitano and Dorothy Hamill, and musical guest Gloria Estefan. Future NFL broadcaster Fox famously aired a special episode of its sketch comedy series In Living Color against the halftime period, which caused viewership of the game on CBS to decrease by 22%.

In the wake of the incident, the NFL began the process of heightening the profile of the halftime show in an effort to attract and retain mainstream viewers. Radio City Productions, who would produce the halftime show, attempted to court Michael Jackson by meeting with him and his manager Sandy Gallin. After three failed negotiations, including asking the NFL for a fee of $1 million, Jackson's management agreed to allow him to perform at Super Bowl XXVII.

Although the league does not pay appearance fees for Super Bowl halftime performers, the NFL and Frito-Lay agreed to make a donation of $100,000 to Jackson's Heal the World Foundation, and provide commercial time during the game for the foundation's Heal L.A. campaign, which aimed to provide health care, drug education, and mentorship for Los Angeles youth in the aftermath of the 1992 Los Angeles riots.

More than 250 volunteers were required in order to erect and disassemble the show's 10-ton stage. The stage was on all-terrain tires in order to limit damage to the playing surface.

Performance
The performance began with a James Earl Jones' voice introducing an, "unprecedented Super Bowl spectacular starring Michael Jackson". Michael Jackson then seemed to appear at the top of the stadium's two jumbotrons (using body doubles). Michael then catapults from center stage and stood completely frozen and silent for almost two minutes before his long-time guitarist Jennifer Batten began the performance. Jackson's performance included a medley consisting of "Jam" (with the beginning of "Why You Wanna Trip On Me"), "Billie Jean" and "Black or White" (includes beginning of "Another Part of Me") including the ending of Batten's guitar solo. The finale featured an audience card stunt, a video montage showing Jackson participating in various humanitarian efforts around the world, and a choir of over 3,000 local Los Angeles area children singing "We Are the World", later joining Jackson as he sang his single "Heal the World" with an inflatable globe. The globe resembled the single's cover art.

Commercial reception
The halftime show was a major success, marking the first time in Super Bowl history that ratings increased between halves during the game.

On the heels of his appearance at the 1993 American Music Awards, Jackson's 1991 album Dangerous saw a 83% increase in sales, moving 21,000 copies in the United States in the week following the Super Bowl. Sales increased further after the airing of a Michael Jackson interview special with Oprah Winfrey on February 10, and at the 35th Grammy Awards (accepting the Grammy Legend Award), causing Dangerous to reach the top 10 of the Billboard 200 and surpass 5 million in total sales.

Critical reception
The Associated Press described the show as, "flashy". 

Jackson's halftime performance has regularly been retrospectively ranked among the best halftime performances of all-time. In his Thrillist-published ranking of halftime show's (which as of its 2022 update, ranks Jackson's performance as the third-greatest halftime show up through that year's) opined,

In his Rolling Stone ranking of Super Bowl halftime shows, Rob Sheffield (in which he ranked Jackson's halftime show the 14th-best halftime show up through 2022) dubbed the performance the last great television performance of Jackson's lifetime.

In a 2022 article, Brian Moylan of Vulture, ranking the performance the tenth-best Super Bowl halftime show up through that year's, credited Jackson's show with turning Super Bowl halftime shows into "must-watch television". However, Moylan also opined,

Set list
The following songs were performed during the halftime show:

 "Jam" (includes the beginning of "Why You Wanna Trip On Me")
 "Billie Jean"
 "Black or White" (includes the beginning of "Another Part of Me")
 "We Are the World" (children's choir)
 "Heal the World"

References

027
Events in Pasadena, California
1993 in California
20th century in Pasadena, California
January 1993 events in the United States
1993 in American music
Michael Jackson